= Addiction Canada =

Former Canadian chain of private addiction treatment centres

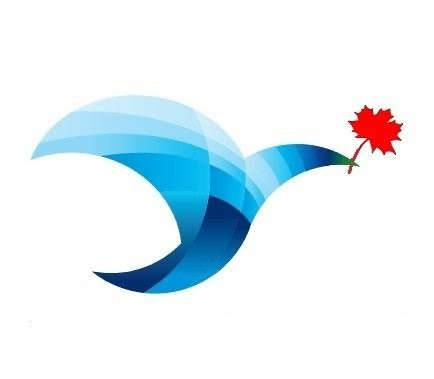
Addiction Canada logo

Addiction Canada was a Canadian chain of private addiction treatment centres located primarily in Ontario. Expansion in 2014 grew to two other locations in Alberta, Canada. The company closed in October 2016 after employees alleged over $500,000 of unpaid wages.

== Media ==
The media regularly seeks experts from Addiction Canada for TV and radio spots, news reports and TV programs on CTV Toronto, Global, etalk Canada, CBC, 1010 talk radio, as well as on the television show on the CTS network and live call in show Living Clean.

== Controversy and closure ==
Addiction Canada has been the target of controversy throughout the years due to the nature of being privately held vs. government owned. This has seen them scrutinized for protocols and procedures because the private addiction treatment business is largely unregulated in Canada.

In May 2016 the CEO John Haines was charged with fraud over $5000 totalling $6.1 million, and one count each of money laundering, benefitting from the proceeds of crime, and trafficking in controlled substances.

There are also reports of staff not being paid dating back to 2015; employees of Addiction Canada and its previous iteration Vita Novus Inc., alleged $516,821 in unpaid wages. In October 2016, Haines said that he was shutting down the company due to "economic pressures" and the "challenges of maintaining the highest standards of recovery care ... as a direct result of false and inaccurate claims."
